Alexander Jakobsen (born Amir Adel Zatuna Elmeshad, 18 March 1994) is a Danish-born Egyptian professional footballer who plays for Smouha as a winger.

Club career

Early career
Jakobsen began his career playing for Lyngby BK and later transferred to F.C. Copenhagen then to PSV.

Falkenbergs FF, which Jakobsen joined in 2015, announced mid-June 2016 that there had been a controversy between two teammates during a training session, wherein one player had struck another. The club later terminated Jakobsen's contract on 23 June 2016. It was later revealed that Jakobsen had struck a teammate with an icebag, causing him to bleed.

FK Bodø/Glimt signed Jakobsen on a free transfer on 17 August 2016. His contract runs through 2017.

Career statistics

International career

Danish youth team
Jakobsen's father Adel immigrated from Egypt and his mother is from Denmark. Jakobsen played 29 games with the Danish U17 team and 5 games with the Danish U19 team.

Egypt
In 2013, he accepted the Egypt U20 youth coach Rabie Yassin invitation to an Egypt U20 training camp. He was part of the Egyptian team that won the 2013 African U-20 Championship.

On 14 March 2017 he received his first call up to Egypt's national team for the friendly against Togo.

Honours

National Team
2013 African U-20 Championship (1) : 2013

References

External links
 
 

1994 births
Association football wingers
Egyptian footballers
Egypt international footballers
Egypt youth international footballers
Danish men's footballers
Denmark youth international footballers
2013 African U-20 Championship players
Egyptian people of Danish descent
Danish people of Egyptian descent
Living people
People from Lyngby-Taarbæk Municipality
Lyngby Boldklub players
F.C. Copenhagen players
PSV Eindhoven players
Jong PSV players
Viborg FF players
IFK Norrköping players
Falkenbergs FF players
FK Bodø/Glimt players
Kalmar FF players
Sarpsborg 08 FF players
Wadi Degla SC players
Eerste Divisie players
Danish Superliga players
Allsvenskan players
Eliteserien players
People from Hvidovre Municipality
Danish expatriate men's footballers
Egyptian expatriate footballers
Expatriate footballers in the Netherlands
Danish expatriate sportspeople in the Netherlands
Egyptian expatriate sportspeople in the Netherlands
Expatriate footballers in Sweden
Danish expatriate sportspeople in Sweden
Egyptian expatriate sportspeople in Sweden
Expatriate footballers in Norway
Danish expatriate sportspeople in Norway
Egyptian expatriate sportspeople in Norway
Sportspeople from the Capital Region of Denmark